Gammat Jammat (transl. Fun And Frotic) is a 1987 Indian Marathi-language comedy-drama film directed by Sachin Pilgaonkar and produced by Satish Kulkarni. It stars Sachin Pilgaonkar, Ashok Saraf and Varsha Usgaonkar in lead roles with Shrikant Moghe, Ashalata Wabgaonkar, Charushila Sable and Sudhir Joshi in supporting roles. The film is about two childhood friends Gautam (Sachin Pilgaonkar) and Phalgun (Ashok Saraf) who kidnap a rich girl Kalpana (Varsha Usgaonkar) in order to extort much money from her wealthy parents.

Plot 

Gautam (Sachin Pilgaonkar) and Phalgun (Ashok Saraf) are two friends living in a rich bungalow owned by their childhood friend's uncle. The two need much money very badly for genuine issues as Gautam needs to pay for his disabled brother Suhas' (Dhruv Ghanekar) leg surgery while Phalgun needs to repay his loans from some people. However, they are unable to get much salary from their jobs or other jobs with much salary. Finally, they decide to kidnap a rich man's child in order to extort money. After several unsuccessful attempts of doing so, they come across Kalpana Korde (Varsha Usgaonkar), a beautiful, arrogant young girl who is the daughter of a millionaire called Dadasaheb Korde (Shrikant Moghe). Gautam and Phalgun decide to kidnap her on learning that her parents are much wealthy. On the planned night, the duo goes to a dance class venue where Kalpana is and secretly manage to kidnap her from her car and hide her in their bungalow. However, they are surprised to see that she does not get scared at all and gives them orders at home as she realises that they are not real goons. She also asks them to hand over the third-part of ransom to her. Dadasaheb also refuses to hand over much money to them on seeing their true nature even if Kalpana's mother (Ashalata Wabgaonkar) gets worried for Kalpana.  Dadasaheb asks a strong wrestler Ganu Pahelwan (Viju Khote) to search for Kalpana. Later, Gautam and Phalgun are baffled when the bungalow owner (Sudhir Joshi) arrives from Dubai. However, Kalpana pretends to be Gautam's wife in front of him in order to co-operate with them for the one-third ransom share to her. After the bungalow owner's departure, Kalpana threatens the duo that she will flee if they step out of the house. She also pretends to be Phalgun's wife when Gautam's friend Inspector Putane (Satish Shah), a local police officer, comes to visit him. After a couple of days, Gautam and Phalgun receive a letter from their childhood friend Shrikant who tells them through it that he has arranged suitable jobs for them in Delhi which delights them. However, a disheartened Kalpana slaps Gautam and tells him that she has feelings for him. Gautam accepts her love and goes to meet Suhas at his hospital but learns from him that someone else has already paid for his leg surgery. On the other hand, Phalgun also reunites with his abandoned wife Ashwini (Charushila Sable). Kalpana then sets out to drop Gautam and Phalgun off at the railway station but Ganu spots her car and chases them. He eventually manages to catch them and takes them to Kalpana's parents. Over there, Kalpana tells them a fake story that Gautam and Phalgun had actually released her from her kidnappers. However, Gautam stops her and tells Dadasaheb the truth who arranges a job for him in his office and agrees for his and Kalpana's marriage due to his honesty and courage. Gautam is then pleasantly surprised to discover from Suhas that Kalpana is the one who had paid for his leg surgery. Phalgun also gets delighted when Dadasaheb arranges a job for him as well in his office. In the end, Gautam and Kalpana get married.

Cast 

 Sachin Pilgaonkar - Gautam
 Ashok Saraf - Phalgun Vadke
 Varsha Usgaonkar - Kalpana Korde
 Shrikant Moghe - Dadasaheb Korde 
 Ashalata Wabgaonkar - Mrs. Korde
 Charusheela Sable - Ashwini Vadke (Phalgun's wife)
 Sudhir Joshi - Bungalow Owner
 Viju Khote - Ganu Pahelwan (Dadasaheb's friend)
 Satish Shah - Inspector Putane (Gautam's friend)
 Jairam Kulkarni - Bar Owner
 Dhruv Ghanekar - Suhas (Gautam's disabled brother)
 Suhas Bhalekar - Sonya Kaka (Phalgun's neighbour)

Soundtrack 

The soundtrack was composed by Arun Paudwal and the lyrics written by Shantaram Nandgaokar. The song "Ashwini Ye Na" attained huge popularity.

References

External links 
 

1980s Marathi-language films
Films directed by Sachin (actor) 
 Indian buddy films
 1980s buddy films
 Indian comedy films